"I Fought the Law" is a song written by Sonny Curtis of the Crickets and popularized by a cover by the Bobby Fuller Four, becoming a top-ten hit for the band in 1966. Their version of the song was ranked No. 175 on the Rolling Stone list of The 500 Greatest Songs of All Time in 2004, and the same year was named one of the 500 "Songs that Shaped Rock" by the Rock and Roll Hall of Fame.

A version by Sam Neely charted in 1975. The song was also recorded by the Clash in 1979. A version with different lyrics was recorded by the Dead Kennedys.

Original song
The song was written in 1958 by Sonny Curtis, and recorded in 1959 when he joined the Crickets, taking the place of Buddy Holly on guitar. Joe B. Mauldin and Jerry Allison continued their positions on the stand-up bass and drums, respectively, while Earl Sinks filled the role for vocals. The song was included on their 1960 album, In Style with the Crickets, and the following year appeared as the B-side of their single, "A Sweet Love". The song received very little airplay.

Milwaukee's Paul Stefen and the Royal Lancers covered the song in 1962; it provided them with a local hit, but it did not make the national charts. In 1964, Sammy Masters recorded his cover of the song. That same year, the song was recorded by Bobby Fuller and his band on his own Exeter label in El Paso, which solidified the band's popularity in the West Texas area with one of his biggest local hits.

Bobby Fuller Four version

After enjoying regional success in Texas, Bobby Fuller and his band decided to switch to a major label—Del-Fi Records under Mustang Records—and they became known as The Bobby Fuller Four. While producing minor hits, the band broke the national top ten when they re-recorded "I Fought the Law" in 1965 with Bobby Fuller (vocals, guitar), Randy Fuller (backing vocals, bass guitar), Jim Reese (backing vocals, guitar), and DeWayne Quirico (drums).

Just six months after the song made its first appearance on the Billboard Top 100 chart, Fuller was found dead from asphyxiation in his mother's car in a parking lot near his Los Angeles apartment. The police declared the death an apparent suicide, but others believe that he was murdered.

The mono and stereo mixes differ in both Fuller's vocals and the guitar riffs.

Chart positions

The Clash version

In mid-1978, the Clash were working on their second album, Give 'Em Enough Rope. Singer Joe Strummer and guitarist Mick Jones flew to San Francisco to record overdubs in September–October at the Automatt studio. The owner of the Automatt kept his collection of classic jukeboxes distributed around the various rooms of the studio complex. Strummer and Jones heard the Bobby Fuller version of "I Fought the Law" for the first time on one of the jukeboxes. Their version first appeared on the EP The Cost of Living in May 1979 in the UK, and later that year was made part of the American edition of the Clash's eponymous album. This cover version helped gain the Clash their first taste of airplay in the States, and is one of the best-known cover versions of the song. The live recording of the song, performed at the Lyceum Theatre, West End, London, on December 28, 1978, features as the last piece of the 1980 film Rude Boy directed by Jack Hazan and David Mingay. The Clash were dressed all in black for that gig, and the song, at that stage, was considered the film's title song. On July 26, 1979, "I Fought the Law" was the first single by the band to be released in the United States.

In 1988, CBS Records re-issued the single (catalog number) in CD, 12-inch and 7-inch vinyl formats, with "City of the Dead" (2:24) and "1977" (1:40) as its 7-inch B-side. The song is featured as a downloadable track in the music video game series Rock Band.

In 1989, during Operation Just Cause, the U.S. military surrounded the Apostolic Nunciature in Panama while trying to capture Manuel Noriega, the strongman of Panama. U.S. forces blasted loud rock music—including "I Fought the Law" by the Clash—to put pressure on Noriega to give himself up.

In 2012, the Clash's version of the song was featured in the video game Sleeping Dogs, as part of a karaoke mini-game.

The song appears during the end credits of the 2014 film RoboCop, the 2016 film War on Everyone and the 2018 video game Lego DC Super-Villains.

Personnel
 Joe Strummer⁣ – lead vocals and backing vocals, rhythm guitar
 Mick Jones⁣ – lead guitar and backing vocals
 Paul Simonon⁣ – bass and backing vocals
 Topper Headon⁣ – drums

Charts

Certifications

Other versions
Hank Williams Jr. recorded a version of the song in 1978, which was released on Family Tradition (1979). Released as the album's first single, it was a moderate hit and peaked at number 15 on Billboards Hot Country Singles & Tracks chart, giving Williams his first Top 15 single in four years.
Dead Kennedys adapted "I Fought the Law" shortly after San Francisco politician Dan White murdered city Supervisor Harvey Milk and Mayor George Moscone in 1978. Most of the lyrics were re-written so the song was from White's point of view; the chorus was changed to "I fought the law, and I won", with the final line in the final chorus changed to "I am the law, so I won." The song portrays White as someone who got away with first-degree premeditated murder and is unrepentant about it and specifically cites his use of the diminished responsibility defense. It also makes use of the reference "Twinkie defense", where lead singer Jello Biafra sings "Twinkies are the best friend I ever had". During Biafra's campaign for the office of Mayor of San Francisco, he proposed erecting statues of Dan White around the city and allowing the parks department to sell eggs and tomatoes with which people could pelt the statues.
Sam Neely's version of the song went to No. 54 on the Billboard pop charts and no. 61 on the country charts in 1975. Another country version by the Nitty Gritty Dirt Band went to No. 66 in 1992.
Green Day's version of the song was used in 2004 for a Pepsi/iTunes commercial that premiered during Super Bowl XXXVIII.
"I Fought the Lloyds" was a comedy version released in 2008 by British band Oystar in support of the campaign by Lloyds TSB customers mounting legal challenges to get their charges refunded. In this version lyrics were changed; the key line became "I fought the Lloyds and Lloyds lost". It reached No. 25 on the UK Singles Chart.

References  

1960 songs
1965 singles
1966 singles
1979 singles
1988 singles
2004 singles
Hank Williams Jr. songs
The Clash songs
Dead Kennedys songs
Green Day songs
Nitty Gritty Dirt Band songs
Songs written by Sonny Curtis
Reprise Records singles
Coral Records singles
CBS Records singles
Columbia Records singles
Music videos directed by Andrew MacNaughtan
Songs about crime
The Crickets songs